Pat Killen (December 24, 1861 – October 21, 1891) was an American boxer. He died at 31, in Chicago while hiding from Minnesota authorities.

Early life
Killen was born in Haddington, Pennsylvania. He later moved to Minnesota, where he made his home for the majority of his life and career (notwithstanding the final five months of his life).

Boxing career
This benefited him tremendously as he was nearly three inches (8 cm) taller than most of his opponents. He was a patient fighter who usually waited for his opponent to make the first move, while setting up his punch. He was known as the best counter-punching heavyweight of his era, but known even more for his devastating one-punch power, winning most often by knockout. Some at the time felt he may have had greater one-punch power than even boxers John L. Sullivan or Peter Maher. However, he was less tough, durable, and was not as aggressive or tenacious as Sullivan, the reigning champion at that time.

Killen's first fight was against John Howard, whom he managed to knock out in the second round. Twenty-one more wins followed (all by knockout) before he lost on a foul against Mervine Thompson. Killen had knocked down the highly regarded Thompson four times, but the referee allegedly kept giving Thompson all the time he needed to recover each time, prompting the crowd to grow angry and storm the ring, as well as Killen taking off his gloves in disgust. All of this caused him to lose via disqualification.

Death
Contrary to historical reports, Killen was not murdered. He died of Erysipelas in Chicago, while on the run from the authorities from his home state of Minnesota, where he had been arrested for assault and battery of two different people, both within two days; both during drunken stupors.  He made bail and fled the state to Winnipeg and then later Chicago. He was 29 when he died.

Legacy
He was rated as the seventh all-time greatest Minnesota heavyweight by boxing historian George Blair. His current (incomplete) record is 55 wins (52 by knockout), two losses, three draws and one no-contest.

Professional boxing record

External links
 

1861 births
1891 deaths
American male boxers
Heavyweight boxers